Nok or NOK may refer to:

Companies and organizations 
NYSE stock ticker for Nokia Corporation, based in Finland
Nok Air, an airline of Thailand
 National Women's Organization (Narodowa Organizacja Kobiet or NOK), a socio-political organization in Poland
 Nintendo of Korea, the Korean division of the Japanese video game company Nintendo

People 
 Nok, the stage name of Yollada Suanyot, a politician and entertainer from Thailand
 Andrew Jonathan Nok, Nigerian scientist

Places 
 Nok, a village and archeological site in Nigeria 
 Nok (Togo), a cave and archeological site in Togo
 Kiel Canal (Nord-Ostsee-Kanal), a canal in northern Germany
 Nok Kundi, a town in Western Pakistan

Other uses 
 Nok (bird), a genus of birds
 Nok culture, an ancient civilization in Nigeria
 Nok Hockey, the game
 Next of kin, a person's closest living blood relative(s)
 Nok, the main protagonist of the Nintendo DS version of the video game James Cameron's Avatar: The Game
 Norwegian krone (currency code: NOK)
 nok, the ISO 639 code for the Nooksack language

See also 
Nock (disambiguation)
Nøkk, Scandinavian water spirits
NOC (disambiguation)
Nauck (disambiguation)